William Guise was an orientalist.

William Guise may also refer to:

Sir William Guise, 5th Baronet (1737–1783), MP for Gloucestershire
Sir William Vernon Guise, 4th Baronet (1816–1887), of the Guise baronets
Sir William Francis George Guise, 5th Baronet (1851–1920), of the Guise baronets

See also
Guise (surname)